Yizhou or Yi Prefecture was a zhou (prefecture) in imperial China centering on modern Linyi, Shandong, China. It existed (intermittently) from 578 until 1734, when it was recreated as Yizhou Prefecture by the Qing dynasty.

Geography
The administrative region of Yi Prefecture in the Tang dynasty falls within modern Shandong. It probably includes modern: 
Under the administration of Linyi:
Linyi
Lanling County
Fei County
Pingyi County
Mengyin County
Yinan County
Yishui County
Under the administration of Zaozhuang:
Zaozhuang
Under the administration of Tai'an:
Xintai
Under the administration of Zibo:
Yiyuan County

See also
Langya Commandery
Yizhou Prefecture

References
 

Prefectures of the Sui dynasty
Prefectures of the Tang dynasty
Prefectures of Later Tang
Prefectures of Later Zhou
Prefectures of Later Jin (Five Dynasties)
Prefectures of Later Liang (Five Dynasties)
Prefectures of Later Han (Five Dynasties)
Prefectures of the Song dynasty
Prefectures of the Jin dynasty (1115–1234)
Prefectures of the Yuan dynasty
Former prefectures in Shandong
Linyi